General elections were held in Chile on 17 November 2013, including presidential, parliamentary and regional elections. Voters went to the polls to elect:

 A President of the Republic to serve a four-year term.
 Twenty out of 38 members of the Senate to serve an eight-year term in the National Congress.
 The full 120 members of the Chamber of Deputies to serve a four-year term in the National Congress.
 The full 278 members of the regional boards to serve a four-year term.

All the newly elected authorities began their terms on 11 March 2014.

In the presidential election, former president Michelle Bachelet fell short of the absolute majority needed for an outright win. In the runoff election, held on 15 December, she beat former senator and Minister of Labor Evelyn Matthei with over 62% of the vote, with turnout significantly lower than in the first round.

In the parliamentary elections, the New Majority coalition (backing Bachelet's candidacy) won back control of both chambers of Congress, winning 12 of the 20 contested seats in the Senate, for a total of 21 out of 38 total seats, and 67 of the 120 seats in the Chamber of Deputies.

These were the first presidential and parliamentary elections in which all eligible voters were automatically enrolled, and where voting was no longer mandatory. Members of the regional boards were directly elected for the first time.

Timeline

Notable events and dates.

30 June 2013: Primaries held simultaneously nationwide. Michelle Bachelet and Pablo Longueira win their respective primaries for president.
17 July 2013: Longueira quits the race.
20 July 2013: UDI picks Evelyn Matthei to replace Longueira.
19 August 2013: Deadline to register candidacies.
9 October 2013: First debate. Bachelet does not participate.
18 October 2013: Campaign advertising starts.
25 October 2013: Radio debate.
29–30 October 2013: Two-day television debate.
14 November 2013: Campaign advertising ends.
17 November 2013: Election takes place.
22 November 2013: The Electoral Service publishes on its website a revised count made by polling officers the day after the election.
1 December 2013: Runoff campaign advertising starts.
3 December 2013: The Election Court (Tricel) publishes the final results of the first round election in the Official Gazette and calls for a runoff election between the top two candidates.
6 December 2013: Radio debate.
10 December 2013: Television debate.
12 December 2013: Runoff campaign advertising ends.
15 December 2013: Runoff election.
Polls close at 6 PM nationwide.
At about 7 PM, Matthei concedes defeat, telling reporters outside her home: "It is clear, she has won".
At about 7:20 PM Matthei gives her concession speech.
17 December 2013: The Electoral Service publishes on its website a revised count made by polling officers the day after the election.
10 January 2014: The Tricel officially proclaims Bachelet as President-Elect during a ceremony in Santiago, and publishes the final results of the second round election on its website.
11 March 2014: The President-elect takes office in a ceremony at the National Congress in Valparaíso.

Presidential primaries

In December 2012 a law was published allowing political parties or coalitions to define their candidates for president in government-run primary elections. The two main political groups agreed to choose their candidates this way. Former president Michelle Bachelet won the New Majority primary with 73% of the vote, while former senator and minister Pablo Longueira won the Alliance primary with 51%. Longueira subsequently quit the race and was replaced with Evelyn Matthei. Sitting president Sebastián Piñera did not stand for re-election due to term limits.

Presidential candidates
List of candidates who officially registered their candidacies at the Electoral Service. All candidacies were accepted on 28 August 2013. Bachelet's candidacy was automatically accepted after she was proclaimed the winner of her primary by the Election Court.

Unsuccessful candidacies
Eduardo Díaz (Ind.): The former mayor of Toltén and founder of the Party of the South (now defunct) is supported by the Alianza Independiente Regionalista (AIRE) movement. By July 2013 he said he had collected around 28 thousand signatures. However, he did not officially register his candidacy before the legal deadline of 19 August 2013.
Pablo Longueira (UDI): The former Minister of Economy and senator became the Alliance candidate for president after he beat Andrés Allamand from the National Renewal party in a two-party primary held on 30 June 2013. However, on 17 July 2013 he unexpectedly quit the race after being diagnosed with depression.
Gustavo Ruz (Ind.): Sociologist and founder of the Movement for a Constituent Assembly was selected by said group as their candidate on 14 May 2013. On 19 August 2013 he stepped out of the race, having collected only 27 thousand signatures out of the necessary 36 thousand.

Opinion polls for presidential race

First-round scenarios

Second-round scenarios

Bachelet vs. Matthei

Presidential campaign

Debates

First round

The first debate was organized by ANP (National Press Association) and CNN Chile and took place in Coquimbo's Enjoy Casino on 9 October. It ran from 20:00-22:00 with all candidates —except Bachelet, citing a prior commitment— participating. It was moderated by CNN Chile anchor Daniel Matamala. There were four other journalists from regional media present who asked the candidates two randomly selected questions. Matamala also asked two questions, which were the same to all eight candidates.

A radio debate organized by the Radio Broadcasters Association of Chile (Archi), took place on 25 October 2013 at the Gabriela Mistral Cultural Centre (GAM) in Santiago. The debate, which featured all nine candidates for the first time, was broadcast by over 600 radio stations across the country. It started at 8 AM and lasted for about 140 minutes. It was moderated by Archi president Luis Pardo and included four radio journalists: Sergio Campos (Cooperativa), Cony Stipicic (Duna), Mauricio Bustamente (Infinita) and Alejandro de la Carrera (Agricultura).

A series of two consecutive televised debates were organized by the National Television Association (Anatel) and broadcast by all national terrestrial television stations. All nine candidates participated, as well. The first part of the debate aired on 29 October 2013, with a second part transmitted the next day. Both shows took place at TVN's studios in Santiago, beginning at 10 PM and running for over two hours. Former Anatel president Bernardo Donoso served as moderator. The journalists for the first day were Constanza Santa María (Canal 13), Soledad Onetto (Mega) and Claudio Elórtegui (UCV-TV); while the journalists for the second day were Beatriz Sánchez (La Red), Iván Núñez (Chilevisión) and Mauricio Bustamante (TVN).

Runoff

A radio debate on 6 December 2013 was organized by Archi. A television debate organized by Anatel was held 10 December 2013.

Results

President

Senate

Senators are elected for eight-year mandates, and roughly half of the Senate is renewed every four years. On this election, ten out of 19 senatorial constituencies were contested. As each constituency elects two representatives, this results in 20 new senators.

Chamber of Deputies

Regional boards

Provisional results including 99.92% of ballot boxes. There were 41,349 ballot boxes for the regional boards election. The results above are a revised count made by the polling officers the following day.

Reactions
Following the result of the first round election, Bachelet said: "We knew that it would be tough to win on the first round, we worked really hard, and we almost did it. We did win tonight, and we are going to work hard to win comfortably in December." Following the first round, both candidates offered no change in aggressive campaigning for the second round except to include young MPs elected in their campaign. Matthei did however compare her politices that of German Chancellor Angela Merkel and Bachelet's to that of the former East Germany. While Green Ecologist Party's candidate Alfredo Sfeir was the only losing first-round candidate to back one of the two second-round candidates, in his case Michelle Bachelet, independent candidate Franco Parisi said "Bachelet will be a great President, (...) Matthei would do bad for Chile, she is not to be trusted."

U.S. President Barack Obama spoke with Bachelet, while the White House issued a statement that read: "The President expressed his desire to continue strengthening the relationship between the United States and Chile, building on the close partnership he enjoyed with President-elect...The President looks forward to working closely with President-elect Bachelet to advance our shared interests in the years ahead."

Analysis
Though Bachelet's New Majority gained a majority of seats in the legislature, it failed to gain a four-sevenths majority required to pass legislation for her cornerstone education reform, which was the reason for mass mobilisation amidst the ongoing 2011–13 Chilean student protests. They also failed to get a two-thirds majority to restructure the 1981 constitution of Chile enacted during the Augusto Pinochet regime. Wake Forest political science Professor Peter Siavelis suggested: "The [congressional elections] result will surely be disappointing for Bachelet. Social movements that have spilled onto the streets are demanding reform, yet the limits of the institutional structure of Chile are going to limit her capacity to engage in reform. Even though Bachelet may be the winner tonight she is not in an enviable position." The Washington Post said that Bachelet's "legacy now rides on her ability to craft a coalition for far-reaching structural and particularly political reform." It also questioned what a low turnout could mean for her mandate, which it said was not clear enough as she had to go to a second round. The Huffington Post drew the 40th anniversary of the 11 September coup as a more than subtle backdrop to the election while saying the election was a referendum on Pinochet.

Notes

References

External links
Election results from 1989 to 2012 (Servel)

Chile
General
Elections in Chile
Presidential elections in Chile
Chile
Chile
Presidency of Sebastián Piñera